The Princess of Happy Chance is a 1917 British silent romance film directed by Maurice Elvey and starring Elisabeth Risdon, Gerald Ames and Hayford Hobbs. The screenplay concerns a Princess who tries to avoid an upcoming marriage. It was based on the 1915 novel by Tom Gallon.

Premise
To avoid an upcoming marriage she is unhappy with a Princess swaps places with a woman who looks identical to her.

Cast
 Elisabeth Risdon as Princess Felicia / Lucidora Eden
 Gerald Ames as Harvey Royle
 Hayford Hobbs as Michael Berland
 Dallas Cairns as Prince Jocelyn
 Douglas Munro as Josiah Buckworthy
 Gwynne Herbert
 Edna Maude
 Cyril Percival
 Janet Ross
 Beatrix Templeton

References

External links

1917 films
British silent feature films
British black-and-white films
1910s romance films
1910s English-language films
Films directed by Maurice Elvey
Films based on British novels
British romance films
1910s British films